Careening (also known as "heaving down") is a method of gaining access to the hull of a sailing vessel without the use of a dry dock. It is used for cleaning or repairing the hull. Before ship's hulls were protected from marine growth by fastening copper sheets over the surface of the hull, fouling by this growth would seriously affect the sailing qualities of a ship, causing a large amount of drag.

Practice
The vessel is grounded broadside onto a steep beach and then pulled over with tackles from the mastheads to strong points on the beach. This brings one side of the hull out of the water. Careening may be assisted by moving ballast to one side of the hull. When work was complete on one side, the ship would be floated off and the process repeated on the other side.

A beach favoured for careening was called a careenage. Today, only small vessels are careened, while large vessels are placed in dry dock.

A related practice was a Parliamentary heel, in which the vessel was heeled over in deep water, by shifting weight, such as ballast or guns, to one side. In this way the upper sides could be cleaned or repaired with minimal delay. Famously, HMS Royal George was lost at Spithead off Portsmouth while undergoing a Parliamentary heel in 1782.

Pirates would often careen their ships because they had no access to drydocks. A secluded bay would suffice for necessary repairs or hull cleaning, and such little "safe havens" could be found throughout the islands in the Caribbean and nearly around the world. One group of islands, Las Tres Marías in Panama, became popular after Francis Drake had sailed there in 1579, and they quickly became a popular place for piracy.

See also
Careening Bay, Western Australia
Careening Cove, Sydney, New South Wales, Australia
Careenage, Barbados

References 

Nautical terminology